The 2019 San Luis Open Challenger Tour was a professional tennis tournament played on hard courts. It was the 26th edition of the tournament which was part of the 2019 ATP Challenger Tour. It took place in San Luis Potosí, Mexico between 15 and 21 April 2019.

Singles main-draw entrants

Seeds

 1 Rankings are as of 8 April 2019.

Other entrants
The following players received wildcards into the singles main draw:
  Lucas Gómez
  Nicolás Mejía
  Emilio Nava
  Manuel Sánchez
  Janko Tipsarević

The following players received entry into the singles main draw using a protected ranking:
  Carlos Gómez-Herrera
  Facundo Mena

The following players received entry into the singles main draw as alternates:
  Pedro Sakamoto
  Thiago Seyboth Wild

The following players received entry into the singles main draw using their ITF World Tennis Ranking:
  Baptiste Crepatte
  Manuel Guinard
  João Menezes
  João Souza
  Alejandro Tabilo

The following players received entry from the qualifying draw:
  Gerardo López Villaseñor
  Sem Verbeek

Champions

Singles

 Marc-Andrea Hüsler def.  Adrián Menéndez Maceiras 7–5, 7–6(7–3).

Doubles

 Marcelo Arévalo /  Miguel Ángel Reyes-Varela def.  Ariel Behar /  Roberto Quiroz 1–6, 6–4, [12–10].

References

External links
Official Website

2019 ATP Challenger Tour
2019
2019 in Mexican sports
April 2019 sports events in Mexico